Lake Eppalock is an Australian reservoir in North Central Victoria about  northwest of Melbourne. It was formed by the construction of a major earth and rockfill embankment dam, known as Eppalock Dam, with a controlled chute spillway across the Campaspe and the Coliban rivers. The lake is situated between the regional population centres of Bendigo and Heathcote and serves as a major water storage facility for both places, as well as the Campaspe irrigation district. The lake also serves as a popular sports and recreational facility.

Location and features
The dam was built by the State Rivers and Water Supply Commission of Victoria. At 100% capacity the dam wall was designed to hold back  of water. The controlled spillway is capable of discharging .

Lake Eppalock supplies both stock and domestic water to the Campaspe irrigation district. It also serves as a water supply to Bendigo and Heathcote and, in more recent times, Ballarat.

The lake is a major attraction for those engaging in watersports, with a number of tourist parks and accommodation facilities available. Permissible activities on the lake include high-speed boating, water skiing, sailing, canoeing, fishing and swimming. The lake water levels were low for approximately eight years between 2002 and 2010 during a prolonged drought, which restricted the amount of recreational activity until rainfall in the latter half of 2010 returned the lake to 100 percent capacity.

Camping is permitted only in caravan parks and/or on private land surrounding the lake with a permit from the land owner.

Built between 1961 and 1964, Lake Eppalock remains the only water storage on the Campaspe River system. The lake was full in August 2000 then ran dry over two years, to 2002. It remained below 15 percent for 8 years due to drought. The reservoir rose from 8 percent in June 2010, to full capacity by November. The lake overflowed its spillway for the first time since 1996, on 28 November 2010, after significant rainfall over the preceding 48 hours. As of August 2015, the lake was at 44% capacity, down from 74% a year earlier.

Lake Eppalock is administered by Goulburn–Murray Water.

Gallery

See also

Lakes and other water bodies of Victoria

References

External links

 

Reservoirs in Victoria (Australia)
Dams in Victoria (Australia)
North-Central catchment
Rivers of Loddon Mallee (region)
Dams completed in 1961
Bendigo